"Men" is a song written by Robert Byrne and Alan Schulman and recorded by American country music group The Forester Sisters.  It was released in 1991 as the first single and partial title track from the album Talkin' 'Bout Men.  The song reached number 8 on the Billboard Hot Country Singles & Tracks chart. "Men" was the Forester Sisters' last top-40 country hit; like a number of other 1980s country acts, the band fell in popularity dramatically in 1991 along with a major change in the country music landscape.

Content
The song describes a love-hate relationship with the male half of the human species, noting both their positive contributions (ranging from the courtesy of opening doors to ensuring the survival of the species) and the frustrating aspects of their behavior.

Parodies
The Bandit Brothers, a studio band assembled by producers John Range and Karl Shannon, recorded a parody of the song called "Women". It was released as a single by Curb Records and peaked at number 57 on the Billboard Hot Country Singles & Tracks chart.

Chart performance

References

1991 singles
1991 songs
The Forester Sisters songs
Songs written by Robert Byrne (songwriter)
Warner Records singles